Kostyantyn Zaytsev (born 20 May 1976) is a Ukrainian rower. He competed at the 2000 Summer Olympics and the 2012 Summer Olympics.

References

External links
 

1976 births
Living people
Ukrainian male rowers
Olympic rowers of Ukraine
Rowers at the 2000 Summer Olympics
Rowers at the 2012 Summer Olympics
Sportspeople from Dnipro